Gadsup/Tairora Rural LLG is a local-level government (LLG) of Eastern Highlands Province, Papua New Guinea. The Gadsup language and Tairora language are spoken in the LLG.

Wards
01. Orona
02. Mamarain
03. Binumarien
04. Pundibasa
05. Asa
06. Kubana
07. Yomuka
08. Karawepa
09. Binakemu
10. Arau
11. Osarora
12. Andandara
13. Erandora
14. Norikori
15. Nompia
16. Tontona
17. Norianda
18. Kosa

References

Local-level governments of Eastern Highlands Province